Caldwell Municipal Airport may refer to:

 Caldwell Municipal Airport (Kansas) in Caldwell, Kansas, United States (FAA: 01K)
 Caldwell Municipal Airport (Texas) in Caldwell, Texas, United States (FAA: RWV)

See also 
 Caldwell Industrial Airport, near Caldwell, Idaho, United States (FAA: EUL)
 Essex County Airport near Caldwell, New Jersey, United States (FAA: CDW)